No. 2 LIVE Dinner is an album of live music by Texas-based folk singer-songwriter Robert Earl Keen, released in the United States on March 19, 1996. It was his last studio album for Sugar Hill Records, a label he had been with since 1984. After that album's release, Robert Earl Keen left for Arista Records in 1997. The performances are from two different dates, the first fourteen tracks (11 songs, described as "Dinner" in the CD Liner notes) were recorded at the John T. Floore Country Store in Helotes, TX on August 12, 1995. Tracks fifteen through seventeen (2 songs, described as "Dessert") were recorded at Cactus Cafe Ballroom in Austin, TX on October 8 of the same year.

Track listing
All tracks written by Robert Earl Keen, except where noted

"Intro" – :33
"I'm Going to Town" (Robert Earl Keen, Fred Koller) – 2:36
"Gringo Honeymoon" – 5:02
"Merry Christmas from the Family" – 3:55
"Five Pound Bass" – 4:04
Band Intro – 1:29
"Rollin' By" – 4:04
"Sonora's Death Row" (Kevin Farrell) – 4:56
"When The Bluebonnets Bloom" (Robert Earl Keen, Fred Koller) – 1:57
"Think It Over One Time" – 3:29
"Amarillo Highway" (Terry Allen) – 2:51
The Road Intro – 5:07
"The Road Goes on Forever" – 8:31
"Dreadful Selfish Crime" – 7:19
Mariano Intro – 2:50
"Mariano" – 4:07
"I'm Comin' Home" – 4:24

Robert Earl Keen albums
1996 live albums
Sugar Hill Records live albums